Deh Darzeh is a village in Rezvan Rural District, Jebalbarez District, Jiroft County, Kerman Province, Iran. At the 2006 census, its population was 16, in 4 families.

References 

Populated places in Jiroft County